Omega (formerly Sharonville) is an unincorporated community in eastern Jackson Township, Pike County, Ohio, United States.  A post office called Omega opened in 1837 and closed in 1935.

A nearby bridge carrying Ohio State Route 335 over the Scioto River was called the Omega Bridge. The Omega Cemetery is located just outside the community to the west.

References 

Unincorporated communities in Pike County, Ohio